Amin AbdelNour Stadium, also known as Bhamdoun Municipal Stadium, is a football field located in Bhamdoun, Lebanon. With a total capacity of 3,500, it is the home stadium of Akhaa Ahli Aley.

References

Football venues in Lebanon
Aley District